is a Japanese media franchise created by Marvelous, which was announced at the AnimeJapan convention in March 2015.

Plot
Each of the series revolves around girls who have been infected with a mysterious virus known as the A Virus (Armed Virus). These girls are brought to separate islands to spend their days completely isolated from the rest of the world until the islands' Observers, authorized by the government Organisation AAA, ostensibly deem them ready to rejoin society again.

Mermaid follows an Extar named Mamori Tokonome who forms a partnership with the Liberator Mirei Shikishima. Bhikkhuni follows two sisters, Rinka and Ranka Kagurazaka, who are infected with a variation of the A Virus known as the V Virus.

Characters

Mermaid Island

The series' protagonist. Mamori is an innocent and naive sixteen-year-old girl who, at a young age, overheard her parents talking about her illness. However, she didn't think much of it until she was abducted and sent to Mermaid island, where she became Mirei's partner. She is an Extar whose transformation is a large curved sword, though she later gains the power to transform into a double-pointed spear through the Valkyrie Effect. Unknown to herself, her power level is far greater than Mermaid's other inhabitants; as such, and with her compatibility with Mirei, she is able to unleash the Valkyrie Effect, the ultimate manifestation of the Armed Virus' powers which can manipulate—or even cancel—its effects in other carriers.

An observant and intelligent Liberator who becomes Mamori's partner after arriving on the island with her. She doesn't speak much but is very protective of Mamori and is shown to be very powerful. Despite having a mature appearance, she is actually a year younger than Mamori. She is a former Soldier (code name C7), a member of an experimental military unit which tested Mirei and her partner's A Virus powers for warfare applications. As a result, Mirei's body contains a special ability known as Enhance, implanted nano-cybernetics which grant her enhanced strength but causes a great deal of stress on her body. Because of her unwillingness to kill a defenseless enemy, Mirei was set to be terminated, but was saved by one of the scientists who gave her her enhancement. Driven into isolation, Mirei found in Mamori a new reason to live.

A crafty girl who speaks Kansai dialect and is often seen wearing a partial cowboy outfit. She acts as a double agent, technically being a resident of Veste while sneaking goods to deliver to the girls residing in Atelier Torino. She often holds bets and scams in order to make money which she can use to activate her Extar ability in the form of a golden mech suit. However, the use of her power consumes both the money and her clothes, leaving her in the nude when her power shuts off.
She is known as Meifeng Sakura in the Funimation dub.

The benevolent Governor of Mermaid, and the founder of Wärter (German for "keeper(s)"), the island's peace-keeping force. While believed by everyone on the island to be the only male resident on Mermaid, she is actually a woman asked by her mother to act like a man in order to stay safe. For physical protection, her mother also provided her with an artificial Extar named Sri. Only Torino and Mirei knew her true gender until she was exposed by Momoka.

The series' first antagonist, a member of Wärter who is cruel and violent. She has a harem of Extars—called the Adel ("nobility")—that she uses all at once when fighting her opponents. She strives to bring Mermaid under her thumb, but is later used as a willing puppet Governor by Momoka.

The Commandeur ("commander") of Wärter who is opposed to Charlotte's despotic regime over Mermaid's residents. She started fighting without using an Arm as her partner, Hibiki, had been left in shock following an assault by a girl gang shortly upon their arrival on the island. Rescued by Akira, she was appointed as the commander of the newly founded Wärter to restore order on Mermaid.

Kasumi's girlfriend and partner. She has been so traumatized by her experience at Mermaid that she refused to leave her room. She decided to join the fight at the very end with the purpose of not letting anyone else suffer the same way she did, apologizing to Kasumi for leaving her fight alone the whole time.

A mysterious woman who together with her lover Lady J forms the duo Lady Lady. Like Mirei and Momoka, they are revealed to be A Virus carriers formerly used by the government who served as Nafrece spies instead as Soldiers, but eventually deserted. As a hybrid of Liberator and Extar, she is able to transform into a powerful beam cannon with variable settings which can, among other effects, disrupt an Extar's powers.

Rain's extremely busty lover and partner who is also an Extar and Liberator hybrid. She is able to transform into a motorbike without her partner's aid. When both girls' Extar forms are combined, they turn into a powerful jet. Her breasts are an N-cup and her areola and nipples bounce out.

The series' second main antagonist. Like Mirei, she is a Soldier (code name A3) and her former partner. She is sent to Mermaid alongside her allies in order to locate the source of the Valkyrie Effect. She also harbors a deep hatred of Mirei for "abandoning" her, which turned her into a homicidal maniac, and has volunteered herself for further enhancement; they enable her to transform her chosen Extar into any weapon of her choice and absorb A Virus carriers to enhance her Arm's power.

A kind-hearted woman who runs Atelier Torino, a town for girls who either do not want to or are unable to stay at Veste. In the final episode, she is exposed as the government-appointed Observer of Mermaid island.

An Extar who is partners with her girlfriend Noe. Rather than take the shape of a weapon, her Arm form causes her to grow to gigantic sizes.

Nimi's girlfriend who gets arrested by the Wärter after Nimi runs away, as they were believed to be incompatible.

 (D5)
 (E9)
Like Momoka, D5 and E9 are Soldiers who have infiltrated Mermaid's Wärter until Momoka was sent to the island.

An Artificial Extar, a combination of the A Virus and cloned human tissue specifically bred for military combat, which was given to Akira Hiragi by her mother for her protection.

Bhikkhuni Island

Rinka and her sister, Ranka, are the main characters of Bhikkhuni. They are infected with a variation of the A Virus known as the V Virus, which gives them the powers of both an Extar and a Liberator simultaneously, allowing either one to wield the other's weapon form.

Siren

Media

Video games
Valkyrie Drive: Bhikkhuni is developed by Meteorise for the PlayStation Vita and was released in Japan on December 10, 2015. PQube released the game in Europe on September 30, 2016 and North America on October 11, 2016. The game was refused classification in Germany and Australia. Valkyrie Drive: Siren, a social game, was launched for iOS and Android devices in December 2015. It was later shut down on July 7, 2016.

Anime
Valkyrie Drive: Mermaid, the anime portion of the franchise, aired in Japan from October 10 to December 26, 2015, receiving an uncensored broadcast on AT-X. Produced by Kadokawa, Showgate, AT-X, Marvelous, Genco and Arms Corporation, the series was directed by Hiraku Kaneko, who also designed the characters. Yōsuke Kuroda handled series composition and Hiroaki Tsutsumi composed the music.

The series was licensed for streaming in North America by Funimation, while Madman Entertainment simulcasted the series on AnimeLab in Australia. Following Sony's acquisition of Crunchyroll, the series was moved to Crunchyroll. In the UK, the series has been banned from being released due to falling foul of the Video Recording Act 1984.

Episode list

Anime Specials
Special short episodes that came with each Blu-ray/DVD volume.

Episode list

Manga
The franchise has spawned two manga series. Valkyrie Drive: Siren—Breakout, a web manga illustrated by Ayase, began serialization on Famitsu Comic Clear in November 2015. An adaptation of Valkyrie Drive: Mermaid illustrated by Yuztan began serialization in Kadokawa Shoten's Comp Ace magazine in December 2015.

Notes

References

External links
  
  
 
 Valkyrie Drive: Bhikkhuni on Steam

2015 Japanese television series endings
Action anime and manga
Android (operating system) games
Arms Corporation
Crunchyroll anime
IOS games
Japanese LGBT-related animated television series
Kadokawa Dwango franchises
Lesbian fiction
Marvelous Entertainment franchises
Marvelous Entertainment
PlayStation Vita games
Seinen manga
Supernatural anime and manga
Television shows written by Yōsuke Kuroda
Tokyo MX original programming
Video games developed in Japan
Windows games
Yuri (genre) anime and manga